Mark & Olly: Living with the Tribes is a group of three documentary adventure reality television series that aired on BBC Knowledge and the Travel Channel which premiered in 2007. The program follows British explorers Mark Anstice and Oliver Steeds as they travel around the world to reside with indigenous peoples. The series was produced by Cicada Productions and distributed by FremantleMedia.

In 2011, the third season of the series was accused of faking scenes and mistranslating interviews to portray the tribe negatively.

Episodes

Season 1 (2007)
Living with the Kombai: The Adventures of Mark and Olly premiered in 2007. The season follows Mark and Olly as they live with the Kombai tribe of West Papua in Indonesia. The forest tribe demonstrates methods and techniques of solving problems using skills and tools unfamiliar to the civilised. Mark and Olly do as the Kombai do 24 hours a day for the entire run of the show.

Season 2 (2008)
Living with the Mek: The Adventures of Mark and Olly premiered on Sunday, February 10, 2008. It charts Mark and Olly's time with the Mek tribe.

Season 3 (2009)
Mark & Olly: Living with the Machigenga aired from February 8, 2009 to March 29, 2009. The show airs at 10 PM ET on Sundays. It charts Mark and Olly's time with the Machiguenga tribe.

Controversy
The series was accused of fabricating translations of interviews with the Machiguenga to portray the tribe as "sex-obsessed, mean savages" during its third season. Glenn Shepard, an anthropologist who has worked with the tribe for more than two decades, and Ron Snell, who grew up with the tribe as the son of American missionaries, called the show "staged, false, fabricated and distorted." Both speak the tribe's language fluently. Shepard compared the show's methods to the film Borat.

Survival International director Stephen Corry said: "One stereotype followed another, with the [tribe] variously portrayed as callous, perverted, cruel, and savage ... TV is now getting away with portrayals which wouldn't be out of place in the Victorian era." BBC Worldwide has decided not to air the show again. The allegations were completely rejected by the broadcasters, producers and distributors.

See also
 Tribe – another TV series with a similar premise

References

External links
 

Travel Channel original programming
2000s American documentary television series
2007 American television series debuts
2009 American television series endings